Warren van Wyk (born 20 November 1997) is a Namibian cricketer. He made his first-class debut on 10 December 2015 in the Sunfoil 3-Day Cup tournament. In January 2016 he was named in Namibia's squad for the 2016 Under-19 Cricket World Cup.

References

External links
 

1997 births
Living people
Namibian cricketers
Place of birth missing (living people)